Tidwell is a surname. Notable people with the surname include:

Bill Tidwell (born 1932), American sports administrator and coach
Charlie Tidwell (1937–1969), American athlete
Cortney Tidwell (born 1972), American singer-songwriter
Danny Tidwell (born 1984), American dancer
George Ernest Tidwell (1931–2011), American judge
John Tidwell (politician) (born 1941), American politician
Larry Tidwell (born 1953), American basketball coach
Monica Tidwell (born 1954), American model
Moody R. Tidwell, III (born 1939), American judge
Thomas Tidwell (born 1953), American forester
Travis Tidwell (1929–2004), American football player

See also
Tidwell Field, Texas
Tidwell Prairie, Texas

English-language surnames